The women's 60 metres hurdles event  at the 2000 European Athletics Indoor Championships was held on February 26.

Medalists

Results
First 2 of each heat (Q) and the next 2 fastest (q) qualified for the final.

Final

References
Results

60 metres hurdles at the European Athletics Indoor Championships
60
2000 in women's athletics